The Holy Lance, also known as the Lance of Longinus (named after Saint Longinus), the Spear of Destiny, or the Holy Spear, is the lance that is alleged to have pierced the side of Jesus as he hung on the cross during his crucifixion.

Biblical references 
The lance is mentioned in the Gospel of John, but not the Synoptic Gospels. Because it was the eve of the Sabbath (Friday sundown to Saturday sundown), the followers of Jesus needed to "entomb" him because of Sabbath laws. Just before they did so, they noticed that Jesus was already dead and that there was no reason to break his legs ("and no bone will be broken"). To make sure that he was dead, a Roman soldier (named in extra-Biblical tradition as Longinus) stabbed him in the side.

Liturgical re-enactments 
The phenomenon of blood and water was considered a miracle by Origen. Catholics, while accepting the biological reality of blood and water as emanating from the pierced heart and body cavity of Christ, also acknowledge the allegorical interpretation: it represents one of the main key teachings/mysteries of the Church, and one of the main themes of the Gospel of Matthew, which is the homoousian interpretation adopted by the First Council of Nicaea, that "Jesus Christ was both true God and true man." The blood symbolizes his humanity, the water his divinity. A ceremonial evocation of this is found in a Catholic Mass: The priest pours a small amount of water into the wine before the consecration, an act which acknowledges Christ's humanity and divinity and recalls the issuance of blood and water from Christ's side on the cross. Saint Faustina Kowalska, a Polish nun whose advocacy and writings led to the establishment of the Divine Mercy devotion, also acknowledged the miraculous nature of the blood and water, explaining that the blood is a symbol of the divine mercy of Christ, while the water is a symbol of His divine compassion and of baptismal waters.

In most variants of the Orthodox Divine Liturgy, the priest lances the host (prosphoron) with a liturgical spear before it is divided in honor of the Trinity, the Theotokos (Virgin Mary), and various other remembrances. The deacon recites the relevant passage from the Gospel of John, along with sections of the Acts of the Apostles dealing with commemoration of the saints. Most of these pieces, set aside, become the antidoron to be distributed after the liturgy, a relic of the ancient agape feasts of apostolic times, considered to be blessed but not consecrated or sanctified in the Western understanding. The main piece becomes the lamb, the host that is consecrated on the altar and distributed to the faithful for Holy Communion.

Longinus 

A form of the name Longinus occurs on a miniature in the Rabula Gospels (conserved in the Laurentian Library, Florence), which was illuminated by one Rabulas in the year 586. In the miniature, the name  is written in Greek characters above the head of the soldier who is thrusting his lance into Christ's side. This is one of the earliest records of the name, if the inscription is not a later addition.

Relics 
At least four major relics are claimed to be the Holy Lance or parts of it.

Rome 
A relic described as the Holy Lance in Rome is preserved beneath the dome of Saint Peter's Basilica, although the Catholic Church makes no claim as to its authenticity. The first historical reference to a lance was made in AD 570 by an unknown pilgrim from Piacenza (often erroneously identified with St. Antoninus of Piacenza) in his descriptions of the holy places of Jerusalem, writing that he saw in the Basilica of Mount Zion "the crown of thorns with which Our Lord was crowned and the lance with which He was struck in the side", although there is uncertainty about the exact site to which he refers. A lance is mentioned in the so-called Breviarius at the Church of the Holy Sepulchre. The alleged presence in Jerusalem of the relic is attested by Cassiodorus (c. 485–585) as well as by Gregory of Tours (c. 538–594), who had not actually been to Jerusalem.

In 615, Jerusalem was captured by the Persian forces of King Khosrau II (Chosroes II). According to the Chronicon Paschale, the point of the lance, which had been broken off, was given in the same year to Nicetas, who took it to Constantinople and deposited it in the church of Hagia Sophia, and later to the Church of the Virgin of the Pharos. This point of the lance, which was now set in an icon, was acquired by the Latin Emperor Baldwin II of Constantinople, who later sold it to Louis IX of France. The point of the lance was then enshrined with the crown of thorns in the Sainte Chapelle in Paris. During the French Revolution these relics were removed to the Bibliothèque Nationale but the point subsequently disappeared.

As for the larger portion of the lance, Arculpus claimed he saw it at the Church of the Holy Sepulchre around 670 in Jerusalem, but there is otherwise no mention of it after the sack in 615. Some claim that the larger relic had been conveyed to Constantinople in the 8th century, possibly at the same time as the Crown of Thorns. At any rate, its presence at Constantinople seems to be clearly attested by various pilgrims, particularly Russians, and, though it was deposited in various churches in succession, it seems possible to trace it and distinguish it from the relic of the point. Sir John Mandeville declared in 1357 that he had seen the blade of the Holy Lance both at Paris and at Constantinople, and that the latter was a much larger relic than the former; it is worth adding that Mandeville is not generally regarded as one of the Middle Ages' most reliable witnesses, and his supposed travels are usually treated as an eclectic amalgam of myths, legends and other fictions. "The lance which pierced Our Lord's side" was among the relics at Constantinople shown in the 1430s to Pedro Tafur, who added "God grant that in the overthrow of the Greeks they have not fallen into the hands of the enemies of the Faith, for they will have been ill-treated and handled with little reverence."

Whatever the Constantinople relic was, it did fall into the hands of the Turks, and in 1492, under circumstances minutely described in Pastor's History of the Popes, the Sultan Bayezid II sent it to Pope Innocent VIII to encourage the pope to continue to keep his brother and rival Zizim (Cem Sultan) prisoner. At this time great doubts as to its authenticity were felt at Rome, as Johann Burchard records, because of the presence of other rival lances in Paris (the point that had been separated from the lance), Nuremberg (see Holy Lance in Vienna below), and Armenia (see Holy Lance in Echmiadzin below). In the mid-18th century Pope Benedict XIV states that he obtained from Paris an exact drawing of the point of the lance, and that in comparing it with the larger relic in St. Peter's he was satisfied that the two had originally formed one blade. This relic has never since left Rome, and its resting place is at Saint Peter's.

Vienna 
The Holy Lance in Vienna is displayed in the Imperial Treasury or Weltliche Schatzkammer (lit. Worldly Treasure Room) at the Hofburg Palace in Vienna, Austria. It is a typical winged lance of the Carolingian dynasty. At different times, it was said to be the lance of Saint Maurice or that of Constantine the Great. In the tenth century, the Holy Roman Emperors came into possession of the lance, according to sources from the time of Otto I (912–973). In 1000, Otto III gave Bolesław I of Poland a replica of the Holy Lance at the Congress of Gniezno. In 1084, Henry IV had a silver band with the inscription "Nail of Our Lord" added to it. This was based on the belief that the nail embedded in the spear-tip was one that had been used for the Crucifixion of Jesus. It was only in  the thirteenth century that the Lance became identified with that of Longinus, which had been used to pierce Christ's side and had been drenched in water and the blood of Christ.

In 1273, the Holy Lance was first used in a coronation ceremony. Around 1350, Charles IV had a golden sleeve put over the silver one, inscribed  (Lance and nail of the Lord). In 1424, Sigismund had a collection of relics, including the lance, moved from his capital in Prague to his birthplace, Nuremberg, and decreed them to be kept there forever. This collection was called the Imperial Regalia.

When the French Revolutionary army approached Nuremberg in the spring of 1796, the city councilors decided to remove the Reichskleinodien to Vienna for safe keeping. The collection was entrusted to a Baron von Hügel, who promised to return the objects once the threat was resolved. However, the Holy Roman Empire was disbanded in 1806 and in the confusion, he sold the collection to the Habsburgs. The city councillors asked for the return of the collection after the defeat of Napoleon’s army at the Battle of Waterloo, but the Austrian authorities refused.

In Mein Kampf, Hitler wrote that the Imperial Insignia "were still preserved in Vienna and appeared to act as magical relics rather than as the visible guarantee of an everlasting bond of union. When the Habsburg State crumbled to pieces in 1918, the Austrian Germans instinctively raised an outcry for union with their German fatherland". During the Anschluss, when Austria was annexed to Germany, the Nazis brought the Reichskleinodien  to Nuremberg, where they displayed them during the September 1938 Party Congress. They then transferred them to the Historischer Kunstbunker, a bunker that had been built into some of the medieval cellars of old houses underneath Nuremberg Castle to protect historic art from air raids.

Most of the Regalia were recovered by the Allies at the end of the war, but the Nazis had hidden the five most important pieces in hopes of using them as political symbols to help them rally for a return to power, possibly at the command of Nazi Commander Heinrich Himmler. Walter Horn — a Medieval studies scholar who had fled Nazi Germany and served in the Third Army under General George S. Patton — became a special investigator in the Monuments, Fine Arts, and Archives program after the end of the war, and was tasked with tracking the missing pieces down. After a series of interrogations and false rumors, Nuremberg city councilor Stadtrat Fries confessed that he, fellow-councilman Stadtrat Schmeiszner, and an SS official had hidden the Imperial Regalia on March 31, 1945, and he agreed to bring Horn's team to the site. On August 7, Horn and a U.S. army captain escorted Fries and Schmeiszner to the entrance of the Panier Platz Bunker, where they located the treasures hidden behind a wall of masonry in a small room off of a subterranean corridor, roughly eighty feet below ground. The Regalia were first brought back to Nuremberg castle to be reunited with the rest of the Reichskleinodien, and then transferred with the entire collection to Austrian officials the following January.

The Kunsthistorisches Museum has dated the lance to the 8th century. Robert Feather, an English metallurgist and technical engineering writer, tested it for a documentary in January 2003. He was given unprecedented permission not only to examine the lance in a laboratory environment, but to remove the delicate bands of gold and silver that hold it together. Based on X-ray diffraction, fluorescence tests, and other noninvasive procedures, he dated the main body of the spear to the 7th century at the earliest. Feather stated in the same documentary that an iron pin – long claimed to be a nail from the crucifixion, hammered into the blade and set off by tiny brass crosses – was "consistent" in length and shape with a 1st-century AD Roman nail. There was no residue of human blood on the lance.

Not long afterward, researchers at the Interdisciplinary Research Institute for Archeology in Vienna used X-ray and other technology to examine a range of lances, and determined that the Vienna lance dates from around the 8th to the beginning of the 9th century, with the nail apparently being of the same metal, and ruled out the possibility of it dating back to the 1st century AD.

Vagharshapat 

A Holy Lance is conserved in Vagharshapat (previously known as Echmiadzin), the religious capital of Armenia. It was previously held in the monastery of Geghard. The first source that mentions it is a text Holy Relics of Our Lord Jesus Christ, in a thirteenth-century Armenian manuscript. According to this text, the spear which pierced Jesus was to have been brought to Armenia by the Apostle Thaddeus. The manuscript does not specify precisely where it was kept, but the Holy Lance gives a description that exactly matches the lance, the monastery gate, since the thirteenth century precisely, the name of Geghardavank (Monastery of the Holy Lance).

In 1655, the French traveler Jean-Baptiste Tavernier was the first Westerner to see this relic in Armenia. In 1805, the Russians captured the monastery and the relic was moved to Tchitchanov Geghard, Tbilisi, Georgia. It was later returned to Armenia, and is still on display at the Manoogian museum in Vagharshapat, enshrined in a 17th-century reliquary.

Antioch 

During the June 1098 Siege of Antioch, a monk named Peter Bartholomew reported that he had a vision in which St. Andrew told him that the Holy Lance was buried in the Church of St. Peter in Antioch. After much digging in the cathedral, Bartholomew allegedly discovered a lance. Despite the doubts of many, including the papal legate Adhemar of Le Puy, the discovery of the Holy Lance of Antioch might have inspired the starving Crusaders to break the siege and secure the city.  Greek Orthodox sources exist which document possession and veneration of an object assumed to be the Holy Lance as early as the 10th century which may have been hidden in the church and later recovered.

In the 18th century, Roman cardinal Prospero Lambertini claimed the Antiochian lance was a fake.

Literary 

In his opera Parsifal, Richard Wagner identifies the Holy Spear with two items that appear in Wolfram von Eschenbach's medieval poem Parzival: a bleeding spear in the Castle of the Grail and the spear that has wounded the Fisher King. The opera's plot concerns the consequences of the spear's loss by the Knights of the Grail and its recovery by Parsifal. Having decided that the blood on the Spear was that of the wounded Saviour – Jesus is never named in the opera – Wagner has the blood manifest itself in the Grail rather than on the spearhead.

In popular culture 
Indiana Jones searches for the Holy Lance in the 1995 comic book series Indiana Jones and the Spear of Destiny, taking place in 1945.
 The spear of Longinus plays a significant role in Robin Jarvis' novel series Tales from the Wyrd Museum.
 The Spear of Destiny is the main plot device in the television film The Librarian: Quest for the Spear.
 The Spear of Destiny is a central plot point in the film Constantine (2005).
 The Spear of Destiny is the main plot point in season 2 of Legends of Tomorrow.
The Spear/Lance of Longinus plays a major role in Neon Genesis Evangelion and Rebuild of Evangelion as an all-powerful weapon and plot device.
The Spear of Longinus appears in Persona 2: Innocent Sin where it makes an appearance during the climax of the game.
The Spear of Longinus appears in Wolfenstein 3D as a plot device in the first expansion pack of the game titled "Spear of Destiny".

See also

Explanatory notes

Citations

General and cited references 

 Brown, Arthur Charles Lewis. Bleeding Lance. Modern Language Association of America, 1910
 Hone, William. The Lost Books of the Bible. Bell Publishing Co., 1979.
 Kirchweger, Franz, ed. Die Heilige Lanze in Wien. Insignie – Reliquie – Schicksalsspeer [The Holy Lance in Vienna. Insignia – Relic – Spear of Destiny]. Vienna: Kunsthistorisches Museum, 2005.
 Kirchweger, Franz. "Die Geschichte der Heiligen Lanze vom späteren Mittelalter bis zum Ende des Heiligen Römischen Reiches (1806) [The History of the Holy Lance from the Later Middle Ages to the End of the Holy Roman Empire (1806)]." Die Heilige Lanze in Wien. Insignie – Reliquie – Schicksalsspeer. Vienna: Kunsthistorisches Museum, 2005, 71–110.
 Morris, Colin. "Policy and vision: The case of the Holy Lance found at Antioch", in John Gillingham & J. C. Holt, War and Government in the Middle Ages: Essays in honour of J. O. Prestwich, Boydell, 1984, pp. 33–45
 Schier, Volker and Corine Schleif. "The Holy Lance as Late Twentieth-century Subcultural Icon." Subcultural Icons, edited by Keyan Tomaselli and David Scott. Walnut Creek: Left Coast Press, 2009, 103–134.
 Schier, Volker and Corine Schleif. "Die heilige und die unheilige Lanze. Von Richard Wagner bis zum World Wide Web [The Holy and the Unholy Lance. From Richard Wagner to the World Wide Web]". Die Heilige Lanze in Wien. Insignie - Reliquie - Schicksalsspeer, edited by Franz Kirchweger. Vienna: Kunsthistorisches Museum, 2005, 111–144.
 Schier, Volker and Corine Schleif. "Seeing and Singing, Touching and Tasting the Holy Lance. The Power and Politics of Embodied Religious Experiences in Nuremberg, 1424–1524". Signs of Change. Transformations of Christian Traditions and their Representation in the Arts, 1000–2000, edited by Nils Holger Petersen, Claus Cluver, and Nicolas Bell. Amsterdam; New York: Rodopi, 2004, 401–426.
 Schleif, Corine and Volker Schier. "The Feast of the Holy Lance: Image, Text, Music, Gender." Opening the Geese Book.  (video also on ). Tempe, 2020.
 Schleif, Corine and Volker Schier. "The Feast of the Holy Lance: History, Politics, and Liturgy."  Opening the Geese Book.  (video also on ). Tempe, 2020.
 Sheffy, Lester Fields. Use of the Holy Lance in the First Crusade. L.F. Sheffy, 1915.

External links 

 "Piercing an Ancient Tale"—An article by Maryann Bird in the European Edition of Time on British metallurgist Robert Feather’s scientific examination of the Spear in Vienna.

Christian folklore
Christian terminology
Gospel of John
Imperial Regalia of the Holy Roman Empire
Individual weapons
Relics associated with Jesus
Roman spears